Ås Avis (The Ås Gazette) is a weekly newspaper in the municipality of Ås, Norway published by Mediehuset Indre Østfold/Follo, part of Amedia. The first issue was published on May 26, 2006, and the company also began issuing Vestby Avis at the same time in the neighboring municipality of Vestby. Henrik Christie is the editor and general manager of the newspaper. 

The paper's editorial material is produced locally, but the newspaper has shared advertising with Akershus Amtstidende and Smaalenenes Avis.

Circulation
According to the Norwegian Audit Bureau of Circulations and the National Association of Local Newspapers, Ås Avis has had the following annual circulation:
 2007: 1,221
 2008: 1,388
 2009: 1,495
 2010: 1,653
 2011: 1,686
 2012: 1,684
 2013: 1,853
 2014: 1,886
 2015: 1,793
 2016: 1,826

References

External links
Ås Avis home page

Weekly newspapers published in Norway
Norwegian-language newspapers
Amedia
Ås, Akershus
Publications established in 2006